The 2019–20 UEFA Women's Champions League knockout phase began on 11 September 2019 with the round of 32 and ended with the final on 30 August 2020 at the Anoeta Stadium in San Sebastián, Spain, to decide the champions of the 2019–20 UEFA Women's Champions League. A total of 32 teams competed in the knockout phase.

Times are CET/CEST, as listed by UEFA (local times, if different, are in parentheses).

Qualified teams
The knockout phase involved 32 teams: 22 teams which received a bye, and the ten teams which advanced from the qualifying round (ten group winners).

Below are the 32 teams which participated in the knockout phase (with their 2019 UEFA women's club coefficients, which take into account their performance in European competitions from 2014–15 to 2018–19 plus 33% of their association coefficient from the same time span).

Format

Each tie in the knockout phase, apart from the final, was played over two legs, with each team playing one leg at home. The team that scored more goals on aggregate over the two legs advanced to the next round. If the aggregate score was level, the away goals rule was applied, i.e. the team that scored more goals away from home over the two legs advanced. If away goals were also equal, then extra time was played. The away goals rule was again applied after extra time, i.e. if there were goals scored during extra time and the aggregate score was still level, the visiting team advanced by virtue of more away goals scored. If no goals wre scored during extra time, the tie was decided by a penalty shoot-out. In the final, which was played as a single match, if the score was level at the end of normal time, extra time would be played, followed by penalty shoot-out if the score remained tied.

The mechanism of the draws for each round was as follows:
In the draw for the round of 32, the sixteen teams with the highest UEFA women's club coefficients were seeded (with the title holders being the automatic top seed), and the other sixteen teams were unseeded. The seeded teams were drawn against the unseeded teams, with the seeded teams hosting the second leg. Teams from the same association could not be drawn against each other.
In the draw for the round of 16, the eight teams with the highest UEFA women's club coefficients were seeded (with the title holders being the automatic top seed should they qualify), and the other eight teams were unseeded. The seeded teams were drawn against the unseeded teams, with the order of legs decided by draw. Teams from the same association could not be drawn against each other.
In the draws for the quarter-finals and semi-finals, there were no seedings, and teams from the same association could be drawn against each other. As the draws for the quarter-finals and semi-finals were held together before the quarter-finals were played, the identity of the teams in the semi-finals were not known at the time of the draw. A draw was also held to determine the "home" team for the final (for administrative purposes as it was played at a neutral venue).

On 17 June 2020, UEFA announced that due to the COVID-19 pandemic in Europe, the final stages of the competition would feature a format change. The quarter-finals, semi-finals and final would be played in a single-leg format from 21 to 30 August 2020 in Bilbao and San Sebastián, Spain. The matches were played behind closed doors.

Schedule
The schedule of the knockout phase was as follows (all draws are held at the UEFA headquarters in Nyon, Switzerland).

The competition was postponed indefinitely on 17 March 2020 due to the COVID-19 pandemic in Europe. The final, originally scheduled to be played on 24 May 2020 at the Viola Park, Vienna, was officially postponed on 23 March 2020. A working group was set up by UEFA to decide the calendar of the remainder of the season, with the final decision made at the UEFA Executive Committee meeting on 17 June 2020.

Bracket

Round of 32

The draw for the round of 32 was held on 16 August 2019, 13:30 CEST.

Notes

Overview

The first legs were played on 11 and 12 September, and the second legs on 25 and 26 September 2019.

|}
Notes

Matches

Barcelona won 4–1 on aggregate.

Slavia Prague won 9–2 on aggregate.

Atlético Madrid won 4–3 on aggregate.

Paris Saint-Germain won 7–0 on aggregate.

Fortuna Hjørring won 3–0 on aggregate.

Glasgow City won 5–1 on aggregate.

Lyon won 16–0 on aggregate.

Arsenal won 6–0 on aggregate.

2–2 on aggregate. Bayern Munich won by away goals.

Twente won 5–4 on aggregate.

BIIK Kazygurt won 3–1 on aggregate.

Breiðablik won 4–2 on aggregate.

VfL Wolfsburg won 15–0 on aggregate.

Brøndby won 2–1 on aggregate.

Manchester City won 11–1 on aggregate.

FC Minsk won 4–1 on aggregate.

Round of 16

The draw for the round of 16 was held on 30 September 2019, 13:30 CEST.

Overview

The first legs were played on 16 and 17 October, and the second legs on 30 and 31 October 2019.

|}
Notes

Matches

2–2 on aggregate. Glasgow City won 3–1 on penalties.

Barcelona won 8–1 on aggregate.

Bayern Munich won 7–0 on aggregate.

Lyon won 11–0 on aggregate.

Paris Saint-Germain won 7–1 on aggregate.

VfL Wolfsburg won 7–0 on aggregate.

Arsenal won 13–2 on aggregate.

Atlético Madrid won 3–2 on aggregate.

Quarter-finals

The draw for the quarter-finals was held on 8 November 2019, 13:30 CET.

Overview

The quarter-finals, originally scheduled to be played on 25 March (first legs) and 1 April 2020 (second legs), were postponed indefinitely by UEFA due to concerns over the COVID-19 pandemic in Europe. They were rescheduled as single-leg matches on 21 and 22 August 2020, with two matches each (one on each day) played at San Mamés, Bilbao and Anoeta, San Sebastián. A draw was held on 26 June 2020 at the UEFA headquarters in Nyon, Switzerland to determine the order of matches.

|}

Matches

Semi-finals

The draw for the semi-finals was held on 8 November 2019, 13:30 CET, after the completion of the quarter-final draw.

Overview

The semi-finals, originally scheduled to be played on 25 and 26 April (first legs) and 2 and 3 May 2020 (second legs), were postponed indefinitely by UEFA due to concerns over the COVID-19 pandemic in Europe. They were rescheduled as single-leg matches and played on 25 and 26 August 2020, at Anoeta, San Sebastián and San Mamés, Bilbao respectively. A draw was held on 26 June 2020 at the UEFA headquarters in Nyon, Switzerland to determine the order of matches.

|}

Matches

Final

The final, originally scheduled to be played on 24 May 2020 at Viola Park, Vienna, was postponed due to concerns over the COVID-19 pandemic in Europe. It was rescheduled to be played on 30 August 2020 at Anoeta, San Sebastián. The "home" team for the final (for administrative purposes) was determined by an additional draw held after the quarter-final and semi-final draws.

Notes

References

External links

UEFA Women's Champions League Matches: 2019–20, UEFA.com

2
September 2019 sports events in Europe
October 2019 sports events in Europe
August 2020 sports events in Europe
Association football events postponed due to the COVID-19 pandemic